= Ice moon =

Ice moon may refer to:

- A full moon in January or February
- A natural satellite composed primarily of ice (whether water or other substance like nitrogen)
